The Arnhem Land languages are a language family proposed by Evans (1997) of Australian languages spoken across northern Arnhem Land.

The name "Arnhem languages" is used by Green (2003) for what Evans calls "Ginwinyguan", and is only tangentially related to this proposal.

The established language families included in this proposal are:
Burarran
Iwaidjan
Giimbiyu (†)
Gaagudju language (†)
Umbugarla language (†)

References
McConvell, Patrick and Nicholas Evans. (eds.) 1997. Archaeology and Linguistics: Global Perspectives on Ancient Australia. Melbourne: Oxford University Press.

Non-Pama-Nyungan languages
Proposed language families
Indigenous Australian languages in the Northern Territory